Comiskey (Cumascach) is a surname found especially in County Monaghan (Muineachán), Ulster, Ireland, where a branch held a family seat. The name was first recorded as being descended from Fiacha Suidhe, a younger brother of Conn of the Hundred Battles. Variants include: Cumiskey, Comaskey, Comesky, Commiskey, and Cummiskey.

References 

Surnames of Irish origin